Sitelinks are hyperlinks to website subpages that appear under certain Google listings in order to help users navigate the site. The site owner cannot add any sitelinks; Google adds them through its own secret automated algorithms. If you have a Google Adwords program you can create campaign and ad group level sitelinks. The site owner can, however, block individual sitelinks, which may be useful if he deems them unhelpful. In Google, there are a minimum of one and a maximum of ten sitelinks per site. According to John I Jerkovic, "Every site should strive to get sitelinks, as they imply authority as well as web presence. Sitelinks also occupy additional search results screen real estate, the space that pushes your competitors further down the results page — something to be desired." Sitelinks are also said to appear "on some search results where Google thinks one result is far more relevant than other results (like navigational or brand related searches)".

Search engine optimization experts consider sitelinks to be an important measure of how "trusted" a site is, and accordingly have attempted to deduce what causes them to appear. These efforts have included looking at Google patents. According to these patents, sitelinks are derived from user behavior, in particular, the number of times a page has been accessed, the amount of time spent on the page, and from the content of the page itself—whether the page contains commercial transactions, etc. In an alternative embodiment, it is suggested that web-site providers might provide the search engine system with a list of favoured web-pages within their own web-site.

Sitelinks with less than 15 characters seem to perform best, according to Google Senior Product Manager Jerry Dischler. There is also an unrelated paid Sitelinks feature associated with Google sponsored links, that allows site owners to submit up to 10 links and allow Google to pick the 4 that are most pertinent to the search.

References

Google